

Canadian Football News in 1925
McGill coach Frank Shaughnessy introduced the huddle system to Canadian football. It was at first called the Conference System.

Calgary 50th Battalion became the Tigers.

The Ottawa Rough Riders club changed its name to the Senators.

Regular season

Final regular season standings
Note: GP = Games Played, W = Wins, L = Losses, T = Ties, PF = Points For, PA = Points Against, Pts = Points
*Bold text means that they have clinched the playoffs

League Champions

Grey Cup playoffs
Note: All dates in 1925

MRFU Tie-Breaker

SRFU final

West semifinal

East semifinal

Queen's advances to the East Final.

East final

Ottawa advances to the Grey Cup.

West final

Winnipeg advances to the Grey Cup final.

Playoff bracket

Grey Cup Championship

References

 
Canadian Football League seasons